Edinburg is an unincorporated community located in Leake County, Mississippi, United States. It is situated mainly on the right bank of the Pearl River at the junction of Mississippi Highway 16 and Mississippi Highway 427.

History
Edinburg takes its name from Edinburgh, in Scotland.

In 1900, the community was home to the Edinburg High School and had a population of 123. A post office first began operation under the name Edinburgh in 1841.

Notable people
Van T. Barfoot, Medal of Honor recipient
Jim Barnett, physician and politician
Martin M. Miller, former member of the Mississippi House of Representatives
Bill Stribling, football player

Notes

Unincorporated communities in Leake County, Mississippi
Unincorporated communities in Mississippi